Yerushalmi is a Hebrew surname literally meaning "a Jerusalemite".
David Yerushalmi (born 1956),  American lawyer and political activist
Eliyahu Yerushalmi (born 1939), Israeli diplomat
Eylon Yerushalmi, Israeli footballer
Rina Yerushalmi (born 1939), Israeli theater director and choreographer.
 (born 1983), Israeli journalist
 Yeshayahu Yerushalmi (1920-1999, Israeli judge
 Yosef Hayim Yerushalmi (1932 - 2009), American professor  of Jewish History, Culture and Society
Efrat Yerushalmi, birth name of Shez, Israeli writer
 (1900-1962), Israeli writer, educator, and activist

See also
 Leon Uris (1925-2003) USA born novelist and humanitarian. Uris is a shortened version of Yerushalmi

Hebrew-language surnames